John Cody (1907–1982) was an American archbishop.

John Cody may also refer to:

John Cody (union leader) (1921–2001), American unionist
John Donald Cody (born 1947), American criminal

See also
Henry John Cody (1868–1951), Canadian academic administrator